Bielschowsky is a surname. Notable people with the surname include:

Albert Bielschowsky (1847–1902), German literary historian
Alfred Bielschowsky (1871–1940), German ophthalmologist
Max Bielschowsky (1869–1940), German neurologist